Olive Square Park is a park located in Toronto, Ontario, Canada, near the intersection of Yonge Street and Finch Avenue in the former city of North York. It opened in 2012.

After the Toronto van attack in 2018, a memorial was set up in the park for the victims.

References

North York
Parks in Toronto